"46 Long" is the second episode of the HBO original series The Sopranos. It was written by David Chase, directed by Dan Attias and was originally broadcast on January 17, 1999, in the United States.

Starring
 James Gandolfini as Tony Soprano
 Lorraine Bracco as Dr. Jennifer Melfi
 Edie Falco as Carmela Soprano
 Michael Imperioli as Christopher Moltisanti
 Dominic Chianese as Corrado Soprano, Jr.
 Vincent Pastore as Pussy Bonpensiero
 Steven Van Zandt as Silvio Dante
 Tony Sirico as Paulie Gualtieri
 Robert Iler as Anthony Soprano, Jr.
 Jamie-Lynn Sigler as Meadow Soprano
 Nancy Marchand as Livia Soprano

Guest starring
 Michael Rispoli as Jackie Aprile, Sr.

Also guest starring

Synopsis
Carmela feels sorry for A.J's science teacher, whose car has been stolen, and persuades Tony to help. Tony tells Pussy, who runs an auto repair shop, to look out for the vehicle, a task Pussy resents. The thieves are found, but the car has been "chopped" so they are told to steal another one. The teacher is surprised when his car is returned with the same plates, but different keys and a different color.

Christopher and Brendan Filone, who has a meth habit, hijack a shipment of DVD players. They deliver the goods to Tony, Silvio, and Paulie at Silvio's strip club, the Bada Bing. However, the truck company pays protection money to Junior, who angrily arranges a sit-down with Tony and the DiMeo family's acting boss, Jackie Aprile, Sr., who has cancer and is thinking of naming a successor. He rules that restitution must be made, which Tony accepts, but Christopher, who thinks he is due his button, attempts to reject the $15,000 that Junior claims. Tony insists on receiving the full amount, saying he will beat Junior down, but Christopher is aware that Tony will take some for himself, and little will be left for him and Brendan.

Although they have been told not to attack the truck company again, Brendan and Christopher, both high on cocaine, plan to hijack a shipment of Italian suits. However, when Brendan arrives to pick up his partner, Christopher, stoned and reflective, decides to sit the job out. Brendan proceeds with the hijacking along with two inexperienced associates. One of them drops his gun, which fires when it hits the ground, killing the driver. When Tony learns of this, he orders Christopher and Brendan to return the whole consignment to Junior and come to terms with him, though first his crew help themselves to a few of the suits.

A small fire occurs when Livia is cooking. Tony insists that she accept a live-in nurse, but Livia soon enrages her and she walks out. While driving, Livia forgets to shift her car into reverse and badly injures a friend of hers to whom she has just given a lift; Livia is forced to move into the Green Grove retirement community. In her house, while collecting photos of himself as a child with his parents, Tony nearly has another panic attack.

Although Tony himself tells his mother, "You've got to stop with this black poison cloud, because I can't take it anymore," he cannot bear hard words about her from Dr. Melfi. Tony speaks to her of his guilt. She says that he must either acknowledge or displace his "feelings of hatred" and anger against his mother; he walks out. In the Bada Bing, when Georgie Santorelli, the bartender, clumsily uses the telephone in a manner similar to Livia, Tony grabs the handset and bashes him with it.

First appearances
 Brendan Filone: Christopher's crystal meth-addled friend and partner in crime. He is rather reckless but he is well aware of Tony's power and hopes to somehow move up in the ranks alongside Christopher.
 Jackie Aprile, Sr.: Acting boss of DiMeo crime family. He meets Tony and Uncle Junior at Satriale's to discuss his cancer and his current position.
 Georgie Santorelli: Barman at the Bada Bing whose ineptitude with the telephone upsets Tony.
 Mikey Palmice: soldier in Junior Soprano's crew who serves as his chauffeur and hitman, whom Tony dislikes intensely.

Deceased
 Hector Anthony: killed accidentally when one of Brendan Filone's goons, Special K dropped his gun during a truck hijacking.

Title reference
46-Long is a large man's suit size. Silvio, Pussy, etc. all try on the Italian suits Christopher and Brendan hijacked.

Cultural references
 Silvio makes several impressions of Michael Corleone in The Godfather Part III.
 Silvio and Pussy mention the death of Princess Diana and whether or not "the Royal Family had her whacked".
 Tony says that the Mayor of New York is the person "least likely to be cloned". The mayor at the time was Rudy Giuliani.
 When Pussy informs Paulie that he got the thieves’ address, he refers to them as "these Spice Girls", a reference to the British girl group, since the perpetrators Eduardo and Jerome are a gay couple (the former being Hispanic).
 When Pussy and Paulie confront the guys who stole the science teacher's car, "Big Pussy" references criminal defense attorney Johnnie Cochran.
 When Brendan and his two associates are hijacking the truck and Special K gets into the truck, there is a remark that "You couldn't drive a Fisher-Price"—a reference to the toy manufacturer.
 When Brendan and Christopher meet with Tony at Satriale's, Brendan insults Jackie by referring to him as KemoSabe, a reference to Tonto's name for the Lone Ranger and a pun on the fact that Jackie is receiving chemotherapy.
When Brendan, Christopher, and Adriana are in line waiting to get into the nightclub, Martin Scorsese (played by Tony Caso) arrives in a limo and goes into the club.
 While investigating A.J.'s teacher's missing car, Big Pussy comments that he is "fuckin' Rockford over here." David Chase was a writer/producer for The Rockford Files for many years.

Production
 This is the only episode that features a teaser scene before the opening credits.
 This episode was filmed in June 1998 (ten months after shooting the pilot).
 The restaurant's hostess from the pilot episode is now in a new role as Christopher's girlfriend, Adriana La Cerva. Drea de Matteo was cast as a restaurant hostess in the pilot episode only, but creator David Chase liked her performance so much that he developed the role of Adriana starting with this episode.

Reception
Alan Sepinwall was mildly positive toward the episode, writing that "some of it – particularly anything involving Tony and Livia […] feels fully-formed and very much of a piece with what we would come to know as one of the greatest shows ever made. And some of it is David Chase still fiddling with the knobs and levers"; Sepinwall considered the family-oriented scenes strong while viewing the subplot about the car theft as "still on the broader, lighter end of the comedy spectrum, […] It's not bad, but it's not quite right, either." In The A.V. Club, however, Emily St. James praised "46 Long" as "a confident expansion of the show's universe", considering it an example of "the show's keen sense of generational conflict, of the ways that different kinds of people come into conflict with each other."

Music
 The song played when the truck driver drives up to where Brendan and Christopher are waiting to hijack his truck is "Piel Morena" by Thalía.
 The song Tony sings at breakfast as Carmela tells him of Mr. Miller's stolen car is "A Whiter Shade of Pale".
 The song played at the Bada Bing when Tony talks to Livia on the phone is "Instrumental" by Zino and the Human Beatbox.
 The song played when Pussy goes over the books at his car shop is "This Time" by Richard Blandon & The Dubs.
 The song played when Paulie and Pussy go to the coffee shop in search of the thieves is "Bop Hop" by Brooklyn Funk Essentials.
 The song the Trinidadian nurse sings to herself as she does chores around Livia's house is "Let Me Call You Sweetheart".
 The song played when Paulie and Pussy find the thieves' apartment is "Chica Bonita (Levante las Manos)" by Artie the 1 Man Party.
 The song played when Christopher and Brendan discuss hijacking the truck containing Italian suits at the nightclub is the Hardshell Mix of "Party Girl" by Ultra Nate.
 The song played when Tony suffers a panic attack while packing up Livia's house is Symphony #3, Op. 36, by Henryk Górecki.
 The song played when Tony beats Georgie with the phone and into the end credits is "Battle Flag" by Pigeonhed.

Filming locations 
In order of first appearance:

 Harrison, New Jersey
 North Caldwell, New Jersey
 Satin Dolls in Lodi, New Jersey
 Verona, New Jersey
 Satriale's Pork Store in Kearny, New Jersey
 Long Island City, Queens
 West Orange, New Jersey
 Jersey City, New Jersey
 Henry B. Whitehorne Middle School in Verona, New Jersey

References

External links
"46 Long"  at HBO

The Sopranos (season 1) episodes
1999 American television episodes
Television episodes directed by Dan Attias
Television episodes written by David Chase